Knnillssonn is the fourteenth album by Harry Nilsson, released in July, 1977. Knnillssonn was Nilsson's final album for RCA Records and his personal favorite while recording it, as his voice had recovered from the damage done during the 1974  Pussy Cats sessions; his songs were more developed and his singing was in top form. RCA Records management agreed and had prepared to promote the record heavily as his comeback album after previous efforts were released with little notice and promotion and were mostly missed by the public. Shortly after the album was issued, Elvis Presley died suddenly, at age 42. Presley and Nilsson both recorded for RCA Records and the unexpected death of Elvis resulted in a complete overhaul of RCA's release schedules and promotion plans. Demand for Presley's recordings was so high, stores could not keep them in stock. Money and resources allotted to Knnillssonn and other new RCA releases was all redirected to promoting Presley's recently issued final album Moody Blue, as well as developing future Presley releases, reissues and the promotion and repressing of Presley's back catalog.

Klaus Voormann, billed on the album as Mara Gibb, was the guest mystery singer on "Perfect Day." The St. Paul's Cathedral Choir Boys choir is also on this track in addition to "All I Think About Is You."

Track listing
All music and lyrics by Harry Nilsson

"All I Think About Is You" – 4:04
"I Never Thought I'd Get This Lonely" – 5:06
"Who Done It?" – 5:20
"Lean on Me" – 2:51
"Goin' Down" – 3:11
"Old Bones" – 2:58
"Sweet Surrender" – 4:42
"Blanket for a Sail" – 2:33
"Laughin' Man" – 2:56
"Perfect Day" – 3:54

Associate Producer: Robin Geoffrey Cable

Personnel
Harry Nilsson - vocals

Charts
Album

Single

Legacy
A cover of the song "Perfect Day", by Dresage and Slow Shiver, was featured in the cold opening of the Better Call Saul season 6 episode "Fun and Games".

References

Harry Nilsson albums
1977 albums
RCA Records albums